Clinton Campbell (1865-1937) was a "locally prominent builder" who worked in Phoenix, Arizona.  Several of his works both survive and are listed on the U.S. National Register of Historic Places. Campbell died in 1937 and was buried in Phoenix's Greenwood/Memory Lawn Mortuary & Cemetery.

Works include:
Clinton Campbell House, 361 N. 4th Ave., Phoenix, Arizona
El Zaribah Shrine Auditorium, 1502 W. Washington St., Phoenix, Arizona
Firestone, 302 W. Van Buren, Phoenix, Arizona
ASU President's House, ASU campus, Tempe, Arizona, built in 1907 in "Western Colonial" style
Bear Down Gym, NRHP-listed, at University of Arizona, built 1926, designed by Lyman & Place/Roy Place, architect, built by Clinton Campbell
A.E. England Motors, Inc./Electrical Equipment Co. building, built in 1926, Spanish Renaissance Revival

Gallery

See also
Michael Sullivan (stonemason)

References

American builders
Businesspeople from Phoenix, Arizona
1865 births
1937 deaths